This is a list of appointments to the Victorian Legislative Council, caused by the resignation or death of an incumbent member. A departure creates a casual vacancy which is filled by a candidate of the same affiliation in a joint sitting of the Parliament of Victoria. The constitution states that if the previous sitting Legislative Council member was at the time of his/her election the representative of a particular political party, that party should nominate a replacement from amongst its own members. This was introduced as part of reforms to the Legislative Council in 2003, taking effect from the 2006 election; prior to that time, casual vacancies in the Legislative Council had been filled through by-elections.

List of appointments

See also
List of Victorian state by-elections

References

Legislative Council appointments
Victorian Legislative Council